Ikasuri Shrine (坐摩神社, Ikasuri jinja, also known as Zama jinja) is a major Shinto shrine located in central Osaka, Japan. Its annual festival is on April 22. In the former modern system of ranked Shinto shrines it was an imperial shrine of the second rank or kanpei-chūsha (官幣中社). It was also the ichinomiya of the former Settsu Province.
It enshrines five kami known as ikasuri no kami or zama no kami: Ikui no kami (生井神), Sakui no kami (福井神), Tsunagai no kami (綱長井神), Hahiki no kami (波比祇神), and Asuha no kami (阿須波神).

See also
List of Shinto shrines in Japan

External links
Official website

Chūō-ku, Osaka
Shinto shrines in Osaka
Beppyo shrines